The Oregon State University College of Business is one of 12 colleges based at Oregon State University's Corvallis, Oregon campus. The college offers business coursework and degrees to students studying at the main campus, the Central Oregon OSU-Cascades campus in Bend, or anywhere in the world through the university's Ecampus. Business classes have been offered at the school since the late 1800s.

As of 2022, the college of business enrolled nearly 4,000 students. The college offers undergraduate degrees in accounting, business information systems, finance, management, marketing, apparel design, graphic design, interior design and merchandising management. An MBA program is also offered through the college with tracks in organizational leadership, accountancy, business analytics, commercialization, global operations, marketing, research thesis, and wealth management. Classes in business analytics are offered in Portland, in addition to Corvallis, as well as a track in executive leadership. In 2014, the college expanded graduate-level instruction by adding a Ph.D. program with options in accounting and innovation/commercialization

The college moved into its new $55 million, 100,000-square-foot home in 2014. Austin Hall is named after college alumnus and A-dec founder Ken Austin and his wife, Joan, who are the principal donors for the building project.
The college's Austin Entrepreneurship Program and Austin Family Business Program are also named after the longtime university philanthropists.

History

Instruction in commerce began in 1898, and degrees in commerce were first awarded in 1904. Four years later, the university created the school of commerce, naming John Andrew Bexell as dean. In 1922 the school moved into the new Commerce Hall, which was renamed Bexell Hall in 1966. In July 2015, Mitzi Montoya was named as the college's 10th dean, replacing the retiring Ilene Kleinsorge. Over the period Bexell headed the School of Commerce, the school changed names three times. It was briefly known as the Division of Business and Industry, then the School of Business and Technology, and finally the School of Business. It wasn't until 1983 the program was renamed to the College of Business. Changes in leadership at the college have been infrequent. Bexell was on the job for 23 years, following a 10-year hiatus in business degree curriculum during the Great Depression. Clifford E. Maser then took over and served for 24 years, followed by Earl Goddard, who held the post for 16 years.

Notable alumni
Edward Allworth, World War I Medal of Honor recipient. 
Ken Austin, founder and CEO of A-dec, the largest dental equipment company in the world.
Kevin Cameron, a former state representative from Salem, Oregon, founder and CEO of Portland, Oregon restaurant chain.
Mitch Canham, Oregon State University Baseball head coach
Wes Edens, co-founder of Fortress Investment Group and founder of New Fortress Energy, billionaire private equity investor.
Larry George, former state senator and Portland area radio talk show host, current CEO of a local hazelnut packing company.
Judi Hofer, former top executive of The May Department Stores Company, now owned by Macy's
John Hubert Hall, served as the 24th governor of Oregon
Rich McCormick, Georgia US Representative and former emergency room physician
Brian McMenamin, national craft brewer, Northwest restaurateur and hotel proprietor, manages 27 breweries
Bernie Newcomb, E-Trade co-founder
Norris Poulson, former mayor of Los Angeles, California and California state senator.
Mike Rich, acclaimed American screenwriter
Don Robert, American businessman and chairman of Experian

Past Deans
1908–31: John Andrew Bexell
1931–41: Degree curriculum suspended, no Dean
1942–62: Clifford E. Maser
1963–66: Silas Petersen
1967–83: Earl Goddard
1983: Cliff Gray (interim)
1984–90: M. Lynn Spruill
1990: Wilbur Widicus (interim)
1991–2000: Donald F. Parker
2001–02: Sabah Randhawa (interim)
2003–15: Ilene K. Kleinsorge
2015–2019: Mitzi Montoya
2019–2021: Jim Coakley (interim)
2021–present: Tim Carroll

References

External links
 

Oregon State University
1908 establishments in Oregon
Business schools in Oregon
Educational institutions established in 1908